Francis Tierney (born 10 September 1975) is an English retired professional footballer who played most notably for Crewe Alexandra and Doncaster Rovers. Tierney came through the famous Crewe Alexandra academy system where he was extremely highly rated by Dario Gradi, and the coaching staff. He played as a winger or striker, and was known for his dribbling skills and technique. Tierney played almost 100 times for Crewe in the bottom two divisions, scoring 11 times. He was an important part of the team that won promotion from League 2 to League 1 in 1994–95, and also played 22 times in the Crewe side that won promotion via the Play-Offs from League 1 to The Championship in 1996–97.

Tierney attracted a lot of attention from scouts top flight English clubs, and a £750,000 fee was agreed in 1993 for Tierney to move to Liverpool. The deal fell through at the last minute when Tierney failed a medical. The setback seemed to knock Tierney's confidence, and the next season Tierney suffered a serious cruciate ligament injury, that kept him out of the Crewe team for almost a year. He never looked likely to regain his former form at Gresty Road, and he was only seen at his best intermittently after that. Tierney also played for Doncaster Rovers as a midfielder where he is affectionately known among fans as 'Sir' Francis Tierney for scoring the golden goal in the 2003 conference play-off final against Dagenham & Redbridge at Stoke's Britannia Stadium.

In his 2005 autobiography, former Liverpool legend Robbie Fowler described Tierney as a "brilliant player...better than most of the other lads in the schoolboys team including myself".

Honours

As a player
Crewe Alexandra
Football League Third Division promotion: 1994–95
Football League Second Division play-offs: 1996–97
Doncaster Rovers
Conference National play-offs: 2002–03
Football League Third Division: 2003–04

References

External links

Francis Tierney Profile on doncasterrovers.co.uk

Living people
1975 births
Notts County F.C. players
Exeter City F.C. players
Doncaster Rovers F.C. players
Northwich Victoria F.C. players
Footballers from Liverpool
Association football midfielders
English footballers
English Football League players